Fassa Bortolo (2000–2005) was a professional road bicycle racing team founded in 2000 and led by Giancarlo Ferretti. Dubbed the 'Silver Team', it managed to be one of the most successful teams of the era, not in the least due to top sprinter Alessandro Petacchi. In its six competitive years, Fassa Bortolo won over 200 races, including stages in all three Grand Tours. It was one of the inaugural 20 UCI ProTour teams in 2005.

Fassa Bortolo stopped the sponsorship of the team after 2005. Efforts to find a new co-sponsor for 2006 proved unsuccessful. On October 14, 2005, a man claiming to represent proposed new sponsor Sony Ericsson turned out to be an imposter, leaving all staff and riders unemployed.

Petacchi and some of his helpers moved to the new Team Milram, a continuation of the Domina Vacanze Team. The other Fassa Bortolo riders all moved to different teams.

Team 2005 
The main part of the riders signed early contracts with new teams for 2006, and eventually all riders found new teams.

Major wins

2000
 Giro della Provincia di Lucca, Alessandro Petacchi
 GP Città´ di Camaiore, Wladimir Belli
 Paris–Nice Stage 3, Fabio Baldato
 Paris–Nice Stage 5, Matteo Tosatto
 Giro d'Italia Points classification, Dimitri Konyshev
Stage 6, Dimitri Konyshev
 Tour de Luxembourg Stage 2, Nicola Loda
 Tour de Luxembourg Stage 3 and 5, Alessandro Petacchi
 Tour de Suisse Stage 3, Wladimir Belli
 Tour de Suisse Stage 7, Marco Fincato
 Giro di Romagna et Coppa Placci, Dimitri Konyshev
 Vuelta a España, Stage 8, 12 – Alessandro Petacchi
 Giro di Lombardia, Raimondas Rumšas

2001
 GP Città´ di Camaiore, Michele Bartoli
 Route du Sud Overall, Francesco Casagrande
 Giro del Trentino, Francesco Casagrande
 Tour Mediterranean Stage 1, Ivan Basso
 Omloop Het Nieuwsblad, Michele Bartoli
 Paris–Nice Overall, Dario Frigo
Stage 6, Dario Frigo
 Vuelta Ciclista al Pais Vasco Overall, Raimondas Rumšas
Stage 5b, Raimondas Rumšas
 Tour de Romandie Overall, Dario Frigo
 Giro d'Italia Stage 12, Matteo Tosatto
 Giro d'Italia Stage 15, Dario Frigo
 Euskal Bizikleta Stage 4a, Alessandro Petacchi
 Euskal Bizikleta Stage 5, Ivan Basso
  National Road Championship, Raimondas Rumšas
  National Road Championship, Dimitri Konyshev
 Tour de Luxembourg Stage 3, Kim Kirchen
 Tour de Luxembourg Stage 5, Fabio Baldato
 Tour de Suisse Stage 5, Dimitri Konyshev
 Tour de Suisse Stage 6, Serguei Ivanov
 Tour de France, Stage 9 – Serguei Ivanov
 Coppa Ugo Agostoni, Francesco Casagrande
 Trofeo Melinda, Francesco Casagrande
 Tour de Pologne Stage 4, Alessandro Petacchi 
 Ster Elektrotoer Stage 3, Luca Mazzanti
 Coppa Sabatini, Dimitri Konyshev

2002
 Giro del Trentino, Francesco Casagrande
 Coppa Placci, Matteo Tosatto
 Trofeo dell´Etna, Fabio Baldato
 Settimana Ciclistica Lombarda, Tadej Valjavec
 Tour Mediterranean Overall, Michele Bartoli
Stage 4, Michele Bartoli
Stage 5, Alessandro Petacchi
 Trofeo Luis Puig, Sergei Ivanov
 Volta a la Comunidad Valenciana Stage 1, 2 & 3, Alessandro Petacchi 
 Paris–Nice Stage 1 & 5, Alessandro Petacchi 
 Settimana Ciclistica Internazionale, Francesco Casagrande
 KBC Driedaagse van De Panne – Koksijde Stage 3a, Fabio Baldato
 Amstel Gold Race, Michele Bartoli
 Tour de Berne, Kim Kirchen
 Tour de Suisse Stage 5, Francesco Casagrande
  National Road Championship, Serhiy Honchar
 Rothaus Regio-Tour International, Alessandro Petacchi
 Ronde van Nederland Overall, Kim Kirchen
Stage 3, Alessandro Petacchi
Stage 5, Sergei Ivanov
 Vuelta a España Stage 12, Alessandro Petacchi
 Giro dell'Emilia, Michele Bartoli
 Milano–Torino, Michele Bartoli
 Giro di Lombardia, Michele Bartoli

2003
 Profronde van Oostvoorne, Alessandro Petacchi
 Spektakel van Steenwijk, Alessandro Petacchi
 Dwars door Gendringen, Alessandro Petacchi
 Giro della Provincia di Reggio Calabria, Aitor González Jiménez
 Criterium Aalst, Alessandro Petacchi
 Ronde van Pijnacker, Alessandro Petacchi
 Trofeo dell´Etna, Alessandro Petacchi
 Tour de Berne, Filippo Pozzato
 Trofeo Laigueglia, Filippo Pozzato
 Trofeo Luis Puig, Alessandro Petacchi
 Volta a la Comunidad Valenciana Overall, Dario Frigo
Stage 1, Dario Frigo
Stage 5, Alessandro Petacchi
 Paris–Nice Stage 1, Alessandro Petacchi
 Paris–Nice Stage 4, Dario Frigo
  Tirreno–Adriatico Overall, Filippo Pozzato
Stage 2, Filippo Pozzato
 Setmana Catalana de Ciclisme Overall, Dario Frigo
Stage 3, Marco Zanotti
Stage 4, Dario Frigo
 Tour de Romandie Prologue, Fabian Cancellara
 Giro d'Italia, Stage 1, 5, 6, 13, 16, 17, Alessandro Petacchi
 Giro d'Italia, Stage 15, Aitor González Jiménez
 Giro d'Italia, Stage 18, Dario Frigo
 Tour de Belgium Stage 4, Fabian Cancellara
 Tour de Luxembourg Stage 2, Nicola Loda
 Tour de Luxembourg Stage 5, Serguei Ivanov
 Tour de Suisse Prologue, Fabian Cancellara
  National Road Championship, Tadej Valjavec
 Trofeo Matteotti, Filippo Pozzato
 Tour de France, Stage 1, 3, 5, 6,  Alessandro Petacchi
 Tour de la Wallonne Stage 3, Michele Bartoli
 Rothaus Regio-Tour International Overall, Volodymir Gustov
Stage 2a, Marco Zanotti
 Ronde van Nederland Stage 1 & 2, Alessandro Petacchi
 Vuelta a España, Stage 3, 5, 12, 14, 21,  Alessandro Petacchi
 Paris – Bruxelles, Kim Kirchen
  Giro del Lazio, Michele Bartoli
 Giro di Lombardia, Michele Bartoli

2004
 Tour of Qatar Stage 4, Fabian Cancellara
 Trofeo Laigueglia, Filippo Pozzato
 Tirreno–Adriatico Stage 1, 2, 7, Alessandro Petacchi
 Tirreno–Adriatico Stage 5, Roberto Petito
 Setmana Catalana de Ciclisme de Ciclisme Stage 1, Fabian Cancellara
 Giro di Toscana, Matteo Tosatto
 Giro d'Italia   Points Classification, Alessandro Petacchi
Most Combative classification, Alessandro Petacchi
Winner Azzurri d'Italia classification, Alessandro Petacchi 
Stages 2, 5, 7, 9, 11, 13, 15, 16 and 21, Alessandro Petacchi
 Tour de Luxembourg Stage 4, Fabian Cancellara
 Tour de Luxembourg Stage 5, Kim Kirchen
  National Road Championship, Kim Kirchen
  National Time Trial Championship, Fabian Cancellara
 Tour de France, Prologue – Fabian Cancellara
 Tour de France, Stage 7 – Filippo Pozzato
 Tour de France, Stage 14 – Aitor González Jiménez
 Züri-Metzgete, Juan Antonio Flecha
 Ronde van Nederland Stage 3, Alessandro Petacchi
 GP Kanton Aargau, Matteo Tosatto
 Vuelta a España, Stage 2, 4, 7, 13, Alessandro Petacchi
 Giro del Lazio, Juan Antonio Flecha

2005
 GP Etruscan Coast, Alessandro Petacchi
 Trophy Laigueglia, Kim Kirchen
 Vuelta a Andalucía Stage 4, 5, Alessandro Petacchi
 Trofeo Luis Puig, Alessandro Petacchi
  Volta a la Comunidad Valenciana Overall, Alessandro Petacchi
 Stage 1, 2, 5, Alessandro Petacchi
 Stage 4, Juan Antonio Flecha
 Milano–Torino, Fabio Sacchi
 Tirreno–Adriatico Stage 1, 6, 7, Alessandro Petacchi
 Paris–Nice Stage 4, Fabian Cancellara
 2005 Milan–San Remo, Alessandro Petacchi
 Setmana Catalana de Ciclisme de Ciclisme Stage 1, Fabian Cancellara
 Setmana Catalana de Ciclisme de Ciclisme Stage 2, Claudio Corioni
 International Cycling Week Stage 4, Kim Kirchen
 Giro del Trentino Stage 4, Andrus Aug
 Tour de Romandie Stage 1, 2, Alessandro Petacchi
 Giro d'Italia, Stage 9, 12, 15, 20, Alessandro Petacchi
 Tour de Luxembourg Stage 2, Alberto Ongarato
 Tour de Luxembourg Stage 3, Dario Frigo
 Tour de Luxembourg Stage 4, Fabian Cancellara
 Tour de France Stage 6, Lorenzo Bernucci
 Tour de la Wallonne, Alberto Ongarato
 Vuelta a España,  Points Classification, Alessandro Petacchi
Stage 3, 4, 8, 12, 21, Alessandro Petacchi
 Tour de Pologne Overall, Kim Kirchen
Stage 7, Kim Kirchen

National champions
2001
1st  Lithuanian National Road Championship, Raimondas Rumšas
1st  Russian National Road Championship, Dimitri Konyshev
2002
1st  Ukrainian National Road Championship, Serhiy Honchar
2003
1st  Slovenian National Road Championship, Tadej Valjavec
2004
1st  Luxembourg National Road Championship, Kim Kirchen
1st  Swiss National Time Trial Championship, Fabian Cancellara

References 

Defunct cycling teams based in Italy
Former UCI WorldTeams
Cycling teams established in 2000
Cycling teams disestablished in 2005
2000 establishments in Italy